Éloïc Peyrache (born 1975) is a French Economist.

From 2008, he has been deputy director of HEC Paris and director of its Master in management course, then interim CEO of HEC Paris in October 2020, and finally CEO and Dean of HEC Paris in January 2021.

Early life 
Graduate from ENS Cachan in 1995 (economics-quantitative methods-management), Éloïc Peyrache was admitted to the agrégation in economics-management in 1998. He got his PhD in economics from the Toulouse School of Economics in 2003 after having defended the thesis at the Toulouse 1 Capitole University.

Career 
Éloïc Peyrache joined HEC Paris in 2003 where he teaches business economics and network economics, he has been a member of GREGHEC (CNRS) since 2004. After having been director of the CEMS program from 2004 to 2005, he was appointed associate professor in 2009. After the departure of Peter Todd for medical reasons, he became Interim Managing Director of HEC Paris in October 2020.

His research interests are in contract theory, industrial economics and competition policy. He is a member of the American Economic Association and the Econometric Society.

References

1975 births
Living people
French university and college faculty deans
Business school deans
École Normale Supérieure alumni
Academic staff of HEC Paris